The 2007–08 Mestis season was the eighth season of the Mestis, the second level of ice hockey in Finland. 12 teams participated in the league, and TUTO Hockey won the championship.

Standings

Playoffs

Qualification

No teams were relegated or promoted.

External links
 Season on hockeyarchives.info

Fin
2007–08 in Finnish ice hockey
Mestis seasons